Africa Rising is a term coined to explain the rapid economic growth in Sub-Saharan Africa after 2000 and the inevitability of its continuation. The Financial Times defines Africa Rising as a "narrative that improved governance means the continent is almost predestined to enjoy a long period of mid-to-high single-digit economic growth, rising incomes and an emerging middle class." It has been particularly associated with the democratisation of African states since the end of the Cold War, comparative peace, greater availability of mobile phones and the Internet, and increase in African consumer spending as well as a growth in entrepreneurship. In the decade between 2005 and 2015, the economy of Africa as a whole increased by 50 per cent in contrast with a world average of 23 per cent.

The term is widely used (including by the BBC) and was the title of a 2014 conference held in Mozambique by the International Monetary Fund. Both The Economist and Time have devoted front-pages to the Africa Rising narrative. The term has been criticised by some as being a "stereotype" of Africa as a continent "brimming with mobile phones and energetic businesses". Critics have also argued that the narrative has been undermined by experience of the West African Ebola virus epidemic (2013–16) and the persistence of conflict in parts of the continent. Some have also claimed that the 18 million Africans considered "middle class" are too small a proportion (3.3 percent) of the overall population to justify claims of rapid social change brought about by Africa Rising.

The term has also spawned a number of spin-off ideas, such as "Latin America Rising" and "Asia Rising".

See also

Economic history of Africa
BRICS, which includes South Africa
MINT, which includes Nigeria
"New generation of African leaders" (1990s–)
Afro-pessimism
African Renaissance (1946–)

References

Further reading

Economic history of Africa
2000s in Africa
2010s in Africa
Development in Africa